Espejos (Mirrors) is the first album by Argentine rock band Ciro y los Persas, released in 2010. The album has been certified double platinum disc in Argentina, for exceeding 80,000 copies.

Track listing 
 «Antes y Después» [Before & After]
 «Servidor» [Servant]
 «Insisto» [I Insist]
 «Espejos» [Mirrors]
 «Banda de Garage» [Garage Band]
 «Vas a Bailar» [You'll Dance]
 «Rockabilly para Siempre» [Rockabilly Forever]
 «Blues de la Ventana» [Window Blues]
 «Chucu - Chu» [Chucu - Chu]
 «Paso a Paso» [Step by Step]
 «Ruidos» [Sounds]
 «Noche de Hoy» [Tonight]
 «Malambo para Luca» [Malambo for Luca]
 «Blues del Gato Sarnoso» [Itchy Cat Blues]

# Trapos []
∅

References

External links 
 Espejos 

2010 debut albums